Santi Maria e Lorenzo is a baroque-style, Roman Catholic collegiate church on Via Giacomo Leopardi in the town of Rotella, in the province of Ascoli Piceno, region of Marche, Italy.

History and Description 
The church was built in 1767, based on a design of Lazzaro Giosafatti. The church has a single nave, but various side altars. Among the interior artwork is a 15th-century polychrome terracotta Pietà, the reliquary of St Fortunato, a 17th-century organ, a 15th-century God the father sculpted in marble. The sacristy is richly decorated and the ceiling is frescoed with the Life of St Benedict.

References 

Baroque architecture in Marche
Churches in the Province of Ascoli Piceno
18th-century Roman Catholic church buildings in Italy